Conor Garland (born March 11, 1996) is an American professional ice hockey right winger for the Vancouver Canucks of the National Hockey League (NHL). Garland was drafted in the fifth round (123rd overall) by the Arizona Coyotes in the 2015 NHL Entry Draft.

Prior to turning professional, Garland played for the Moncton Wildcats in the Quebec Major Junior Hockey League (QMJHL) where he was awarded the Michel Brière Memorial Trophy as the QMJHL Most Valuable Player and twice selected for the QMJHL First All-Star Team. After a successful stint with the Coyotes' American Hockey League affiliate, the Tucson Roadrunners, he played parts of three NHL seasons before the Coyotes traded him to the Canucks.

Early life
Garland was born on March 11, 1996, in Scituate, Massachusetts to parents Bridget, a train station foreman, and Garry, who was a collegiate hockey player. He also has three sisters, two of whom played collegiate lacrosse. He began skating at the age of four and attended skating clinics run by Michael Botticelli.

Playing career

Youth
Growing up in Massachusetts, Garland played youth hockey with Boston Mission and Team Massachusetts. He then attended Shattuck-Saint Mary's, a boarding school in Minnesota, where he recorded 116 points in 52 games. At the age of 14, Garland was cut from their bantam team due to his height. and subsequently joined the Boston Junior Bruins in the Empire Junior Hockey League (EmJHL) for the 2011–12 season. Following his first season with the Bruins, in which he recorded 94 points in 40 games, Garland was drafted in the sixth round of the 2012 Quebec Major Junior Hockey League (QMJHL) Draft by the Moncton Wildcats.

After beginning the 2012–13 season with the Muskegon Lumberjacks in the United States Hockey League (USHL), Garland moved to playing for the Wildcats in the QMJHL, foregoing his NCAA eligibility.

Juniors
During the 2014–15 season, while playing with the Wildcats, Garland led both the QMJHL and Canadian Hockey League (CHL) with 129 points. He was named to the QMJHL First All-Star Team, and was further honored when he was awarded the Michel Brière Memorial Trophy as the QMJHL Most Valuable Player. Garland was then selected 123rd overall in the 2015 NHL Entry Draft, by the Arizona Coyotes.

Arizona Coyotes

While in his final season of junior with the Wildcats, Garland was signed to a three-year entry-level contract by the Coyotes on December 23, 2015. Following the conclusion of the season, Garland was invited to participate in the Coyotes 2016 development camp and remained in the state for the remainder of the offseason. Following camp, Garland was re-assigned to the Coyotes American Hockey League (AHL) affiliate, the Tucson Roadrunners, for the 2016–17 season. He recorded his first professional goal on December 2, 2016, against the San Diego Gulls.

After attending training camp, Garland was re-assigned to the Roadrunners to begin the 2018–19 season. He led the team with 19 points before earning his first NHL call-up on December 3. His recall was due to his outstanding play at the AHL level and the belief that he minimized his bad habits from junior hockey and became a more complete player. He made his NHL debut on December 8, 2018, in a 5–3 loss to the San Jose Sharks. During his callup, he earned a top-line left-wing role alongside center Nick Schmaltz and Clayton Keller. Through his first 36 games with the Coyotes, Garland accumulated 12 goals and three assists for 15 points and 10 penalty minutes. He also tied for third on the team in goals and power-play goals. Having established a role within the Coyotes, adding 12 goals in 35 games, Garland was signed to a two-year, $1.55 million contract extension on February 27, 2019. Despite his offensive output, the Coyotes were eliminated from playoff contention on April 5, 2019, in a loss to the Vegas Golden Knights. He finished the season with 13 goals and five assists through 47 NHL games.

During a game against the Calgary Flames, Garland suffered a lower-body injury when he collided with goaltender Cam Talbot. On March 8, 2020, it was announced that Garland would be week to week with a lower-body injury. At the time of the injury, he led the team in goals and was tied third for points with 39. He tallied 22 goals and 17 assists for 39 points through 68 regular season games and set single-season career highs in games, goals, assists, points, game-winning goals and shots. Six days following the injury, the NHL paused the season due to concerns surrounding the coronavirus. Once they returned to play, Garland was healthy and rejoined the lineup. On June 9, Garland was the Coyotes nominee for the Bill Masterton Memorial Trophy as a "player who best exemplifies the qualities of perseverance, sportsmanship, and dedication to hockey."

During practice, Garland suffered another lower-body injury and was listed as week-to-week. Upon returning from the injury, Garland tallied six points through three games to rank third on the team in scoring with 38 points. During the season, the Coyotes played the St. Louis Blues seven times. During the series, he played with Schmaltz and Keller on the Coyotes' "Short Leash Line" which combined for 21 points. As the 2021 NHL Expansion Draft approached, Garland was one of seven forwards protected by the Coyotes.

Vancouver Canucks
On July 23, 2021, Garland's restricted free agent signing rights were traded, along with Oliver Ekman-Larsson, to the Vancouver Canucks in exchange for Jay Beagle, Loui Eriksson, Antoine Roussel, a 2021 first-round pick, a 2022 second-round pick, and a 2023 seventh-round pick. Prior to the start of the 2021–22 season, Garland signed a five-year, $24.75 million contract extension with the Canucks.

Career statistics

Regular season and playoffs

International

Awards and honours

References

External links

1996 births
Living people
American men's ice hockey right wingers
Arizona Coyotes draft picks
Arizona Coyotes players
Ice hockey players from Massachusetts
Moncton Wildcats players
Muskegon Lumberjacks players
People from Scituate, Massachusetts
Sportspeople from Plymouth County, Massachusetts
Tucson Roadrunners players
Vancouver Canucks players